Lucknow Graduates constituency is one of 100 Legislative Council seats in Uttar Pradesh. This constituency covers Lucknow, Barabanki, Hardoi, Rae Bareli, Pratapgarh, Sitapur and Lakhimpur Kheri districts.

Members of Legislative Council

See also
Lucknow Cantonment (Assembly constituency)
Lucknow (Lok Sabha constituency)

References

External links
Upvidhanparishad.nic.in
Sps.pls-lpc.org
Indiaelectionresults.in
Pib.nic.in

Uttar Pradesh Legislative Council
Graduates constituencies in India